Zhang Yi (Chinese: 张一; born 17 August 1993) is a Chinese football player who currently plays for Chinese Super League side Tianjin Jinmen Tiger, on loan from Shanghai SIPG.

Club career
Zhang started his professional football career in 2011 when he was loaned to Shanghai Zobon's squad for the 2011 China League Two campaign.   He joined Chinese Super League's newcomer Shanghai Dongya in 2013.  He eventually made his league debut for Shanghai East Asia on 30 April 2014 in a game against Guangzhou Evergrande. On 11 November 2018, he scored his first senior goal in a 3–2 away defeat against Tianjin Quanjian.

Career statistics 
Statistics accurate as of match played 1 January 2022.

Honours

Club
Shanghai SIPG
Chinese Super League: 2018

References

External links
 

1993 births
Living people
Chinese footballers
Footballers from Hunan
People from Huaihua
Pudong Zobon players
Shanghai Port F.C. players
China League Two players
Chinese Super League players
Association football defenders